George Newstead (11 August 1910 – 21 July 2000) was an Australian cricketer. He played eight first-class cricket matches for Victoria between 1931 and 1936.

See also
 List of Victoria first-class cricketers

References

External links
 

1910 births
2000 deaths
Australian cricketers
Victoria cricketers
Cricketers from Melbourne